Algirdas Teodoras Lauritėnas (November 5, 1932 – August 7, 2001) was a Lithuanian basketball player. He was a member of the Soviet team during the 1950s, and won a silver medal at the 1956 Summer Olympics. He was also part of the team that became European champion in 1953 and 1957 and won a bronze medal in 1955.

References

1932 births
2001 deaths
Olympic basketball players of the Soviet Union
Basketball players at the 1956 Summer Olympics
Lithuanian men's basketball players
Soviet men's basketball players
Basketball players from Kaunas
Olympic silver medalists for the Soviet Union
FIBA EuroBasket-winning players
Olympic medalists in basketball
Medalists at the 1956 Summer Olympics